Midlakes High School is the only high school (9-12) in the Phelps-Clifton Springs Central School District in Ontario County, New York.  The high school services all of the town of Phelps and village of Clifton Springs, and portions of the towns of Manchester, Seneca, Geneva, and Hopewell, and it is attached to the Midlakes Middle School.

The school has around 700 students at around 110 per graduating class. It offers six Advanced Placement courses: Calculus AB, Biology, US History, World History, Language, and Literature.

The school's sports teams are called the "Screaming Eagles" with Black, Columbia Blue, and White Colors. They are in Section V.

Athletically, the Boys Volleyball and Boys Track teams coached by Kyle Salisbury and Carl Spoto respectively have won recent sectional titles. The Volleyball team has recently won sectional titles in 2006 and 2007. The basketball team won a Section V title in the '08-'09 season. The Cheerleading Team has won sectional titles in 2010 in their winter and fall seasons, and a title in the 2011 winter season. John Lombardi is the Athletic Director.

References

Public high schools in New York (state)
Schools in Ontario County, New York